Don Pedro may refer to:
 Don Pedro (play), a play by Richard Cumberland
 Don Pedro (Shakespeare character), a character in Shakespeare's Much Ado About Nothing
 Don Pedro Dam, California
 Don Pedro Reservoir, California
 Don Pedro Island, Florida

See also
 Lake Don Pedro, California, a census-designated place